Gostkowo may refer to the following places:
Gostkowo, Kuyavian-Pomeranian Voivodeship (north-central Poland)
Gostkowo, Ciechanów County in Masovian Voivodeship (east-central Poland)
Gostkowo, Bytów County in Pomeranian Voivodeship (north Poland)
Gostkowo, Ostrów Mazowiecka County in Masovian Voivodeship (east-central Poland)
Gostkowo, Przasnysz County in Masovian Voivodeship (east-central Poland)
Gostkowo, Pułtusk County in Masovian Voivodeship (east-central Poland)
Gostkowo, Greater Poland Voivodeship (west-central Poland)
Gostkowo, Słupsk County in Pomeranian Voivodeship (north Poland)
Gostkowo, West Pomeranian Voivodeship (north-west Poland)